Kristan is a given name. Notable people with the given name include:

Kristan Bromley (born 1972), British skeleton racer 
Kristan Cunningham, American actress and interior designer 
Kristan Higgins, American author
Kristan Kennedy (born 1972), American artist, curator, and educator
Kristan Singleton (born 1971), United States Virgin Islands swimmer

See also
Kristan, surname